1-Octen-3-yl acetate is a chemical compound with molecular formula C10H18O2.  It is an ester of acetic acid and oct-1-en-3-ol.  It exists as two enantiomers and can be obtained as a racemic mixture.  It is a component of lavender oil.

References 

Acetate esters
Alkene derivatives